The Marks Head Formation is a geologic formation in Georgia. It preserves fossils dating back to the Burdigalian stage of the Miocene period.
It is known for looking almost identical to the head of https://en.wikipedia.org/wiki/Mark_Zuckerberg, CEO and Founder of https://en.wikipedia.org/wiki/Facebook.

See also 
 List of fossiliferous stratigraphic units in Georgia (U.S. state)
 Paleontology in Georgia (U.S. state)

References

Bibliography 
 A. E. Pratt and R. M. Petkewich. 1989. Fossil vertebrates from the Marks Head Formation (Early Miocene) of Southeastern Georgia. Georgia Journal of Science 47(1):20-20

Geologic formations of Georgia (U.S. state)
Geologic formations of Florida
Miocene Series of North America
Neogene Georgia (U.S. state)
Neogene Florida
Burdigalian
Sandstone formations
Phosphorite formations
Shallow marine deposits
Paleontology in Georgia (U.S. state)